Mistakes Were Made (but Not by Me) is a 2007 non-fiction book by social psychologists Carol Tavris and Elliot Aronson. It deals with  cognitive dissonance, confirmation bias and other cognitive biases, using these psychological theories to illustrate how the perpetrators (and victims) of hurtful acts justify and rationalize their behavior. It describes a positive feedback loop of action and self-deception by which slight differences between people's attitudes become polarized.

Topics and people mentioned

 The doomsday cult described in When Prophecy Fails
 The MMR vaccine controversy and Andrew Wakefield
 Conflict escalation in marriage and intergroup relations
 Day care sex abuse hysteria, alien abduction memories, and false memory syndrome
 Statements by Al Campanis and Mel Gibson justifying racism
 Confabulation of autobiographical memory
 False certainty in pseudoscience
 Self-justification and conflict of interest in medicine and politics
 George W. Bush and the Iraq War
 Justification of aggression, war, and torture
 Criminal interrogation, the pseudoscientific Reid technique, and false confessions
 Trials, capital punishment, police perjury, and miscarriage of justice
 Oprah Winfrey and her involvement in the James Frey controversy
 Carol Dweck's research on mistakes and learning

Reception
Philosopher Daniele Procida described the book as an "immensely engaging and intelligent volume" and "a genuinely illuminating contribution to the study of human nature" but also criticised the book's informal style and sometimes outdated assumptions.

Michael Shermer in the Scientific American wrote that Tavris and Aronson brilliantly illuminate the fallacies that underlie irrational behavior.

A review in O, The Oprah Magazine praised the book for "the scientific evidence it provides and the charm of its down-to-earth, commonsensical tone".

A review in The Guardian described the book as "excellent" and suggests the quotation, "If mistakes were made, memory helps us remember that they were made by someone else", should be printed on autobiographies and political memoirs as a warning to the public.  The British comedian and novelist Alexei Sayle listed the book among his six favorites, recommending it as "endlessly fascinating if you're interested in politics."

See also

List of cognitive biases
List of memory biases
Mistakes were made
Non-apology apology
Non-denial denial

References

External links
 Archive of Carol Tavris' official site for the book
 "Why It's Hard to Admit to Being Wrong" Interview with Elliot Aronson on National Public Radio, broadcast July 20, 2007
 Point of Inquiry interview with Carol Tavris about the book (podcast) August 3, 2007

2007 non-fiction books
Books about cognition
Books about social psychology
Books about bias
Cognitive biases
English-language books